Ida Cogswell Bailey Allen (January 30, 1885 – July 16, 1973) was an American chef and author who was once popularly known as "The Nation's Homemaker,"  writing more than 50 cookbooks.  She was described as "The original domestic goddess" by antique cookbook experts Patricia Edwards and Peter Peckham.

Early years
Allen was born in 1885 in Danielson, Connecticut.

Career

In 1924 Allen was food editor of the Sunday New York American. By 1928 she was hosting a regular daytime radio show which expanded to two hours the following year. She not only performed on the show, she also produced and sold her own advertising; she was a pioneer in selling spot advertising rather than having a single company sponsor a show. The program ended in 1932, at which time she began a syndicated cooking show on the Columbia Broadcasting System.  She became television's first female food host on Mrs. Allen and the Chef.

She was an editor of Good Housekeeping, writing the "Three Meals a Day" column, as well as Home Economics Editor of Pictorial Review and Woman's World.  She was President and founder of the National Radio Home-Makers Club. During World War II, Allen was drafted by the US Food Administrator as lecturer.

She once lived atop 400 Madison Avenue, New York City where visitors were able to see the "latest developments in homemaking", and could watch her staff develop and test new recipes for cooking. A 1932 promotional book she wrote for Coca-Cola, When You Entertain, was so popular 375,000 copies were sold in under six months.

Death

Allen died July 16, 1973, in Norwalk, Connecticut.

Published works

This is a partial list of Allen's published works. 

  For The Bride - Helpful Hints Practical Suggestions and Valuable Records.  Reuben Donnelley Corp., Chicago 1922 & 1923. 
 Home Partners, or, Seeing the Family Through, Privately Printed, 1924

 Your Foods and You, PF Collier & Son, 1929

 
 Gastronomique: A Cookbook for Gourmets, 1962
 Best Loved Recipes of the American People, 1973

References

1885 births
1973 deaths
American women chefs
American women nutritionists
American nutritionists
American food writers
Radio personalities from Connecticut
American radio producers
American television chefs
Dietitians
Women food writers
American gastronomes
Women cookbook writers
American women non-fiction writers
Chefs from Connecticut
20th-century American non-fiction writers
20th-century American journalists
American women journalists
20th-century American women writers
Women radio producers